Hannah Lilian Wilkinson (born 28 May 1992) is a New Zealand football player who plays for Melbourne City in the Australian W-League and the New Zealand national team.

College career
Wilkinson joined the Tennessee Volunteers as a sophomore in 2012. She received first team All-South-eastern Conference honors in her debut season. Wilkinson lead the SEC with eight goals and 17 points in conference play. Despite joining the team after the London Olympics,  five matches into the season, Wilkinson led Tennessee in goals (eight), points (17), shots (48), shot percentage (.167) and match-winners (four). For her heroics against the Aggies and the Rebels, she received the SEC Offensive Player of the Week, Top Drawer Soccer National Team of the Week, Soccer America Team of the Week and TSWA Women's Soccer Player of the Week accolades.
In November of her senior season the NCAA granted her eligibility for the 2015 season. She was originally assigned a sophomore status when she enrolled at Tennessee after previously attending classes at Auckland University of Technology for one year. She tore her ACL in August 2015 and was granted a medical redshirt year.

Club career
Wilkinson signed for Damallsvenskan side Vittsjö GIK in March 2017. In October 2018, Wilkinson tore her anterior cruciate ligament during a cup game against Jitex BK.

In July 2019, Wilkinson signed with Portuguese Campeonato Nacional team Sporting CP.

In August 2021, Wilkinson joined Australian club Melbourne City.

International career

National youth teams
Wilkinson first played for the New Zealand under 20 side in January 2010 and impressed national selector John Herdman with 5 goals in 3 games, including a hat-trick in her first, earning herself a call up to the senior side for friendlies against Australia and a trip to the Cyprus Cup. 
In 2010, she represented New Zealand at the 2010 FIFA U-20 Women's World Cup, appearing in all three group games.
She also appeared in all three group games for New Zealand during the 2012 FIFA U-20 Women's World Cup, which took place in Japan.

Senior national team
Wilkinson made her senior international debut for New Zealand in the starting lineup in a friendly against Australia on 17 February 2010.
She made her first FIFA Women's World Cup appearance in the 2011 FIFA Women's World Cup, appearing in all three group matches as a substitute. In the last match, she scored in the 94th minute to force a draw with Mexico.
Wilkinson appeared in three of New Zealand's four matches in the 2012 London Olympics.
She played of all New Zealand's three matches at the 2015 FIFA Women's World Cup in Canada.
She started in all three of New Zealand's matches at the 2016 Olympics in Brazil.

In April 2019, Wilkinson was named to the final 23-player squad for the 2019 FIFA Women's World Cup, after a remarkable recovery from her ACL injury.

On 27 July 2021, she played her 100th match for New Zealand during the 2020 Summer Olympics.

Selected International goals

Honours and awards

League
Northern Region Premier Women's League Championship: 2010, 2011
National Youth Women's League Championship: 2011

Individual
Burridge Cup: 2008, 2009
2011 NZF Young Player of the Year
2012 All-SEC 1st Team
2012 NSCAA/Continental Tire Women's NCAA Division I All-American 3rd Team

Personal life
Aside from soccer, Wilkinson says she enjoys playing the drums and guitar and surfing. She has released two single songs on Spotify. Waiting for the Sun was released in January 2019 and the second, Set Me Free, in April 2019. 

Wilkinson is openly gay.

References

External links

 Profile at NZF
 

1992 births
Living people
New Zealand women's association footballers
Sportspeople from Whangārei
2011 FIFA Women's World Cup players
2015 FIFA Women's World Cup players
Footballers at the 2012 Summer Olympics
Olympic association footballers of New Zealand
Tennessee Volunteers women's soccer players
New Zealand women's international footballers
Footballers at the 2016 Summer Olympics
LGBT association football players
Women's association football forwards
2019 FIFA Women's World Cup players
New Zealand LGBT sportspeople
Sporting CP (women's football) players
Lesbian sportswomen
People educated at Kamo High School
Damallsvenskan players
Vittsjö GIK players
Djurgårdens IF Fotboll (women) players
MSV Duisburg (women) players
Melbourne City FC (A-League Women) players
Footballers at the 2020 Summer Olympics
FIFA Century Club
New Zealand expatriate sportspeople in Germany
Expatriate women's footballers in Germany
New Zealand expatriate sportspeople in Portugal
Expatriate women's footballers in Portugal
Expatriate women's soccer players in Australia
New Zealand expatriate sportspeople in Australia
Expatriate women's footballers in Sweden
New Zealand expatriate sportspeople in Sweden
Expatriate women's soccer players in the United States
New Zealand expatriate sportspeople in the United States
New Zealand expatriate women's association footballers